The 2000 President's Cup was a men's tennis tournament played on Hard in Tashkent, Uzbekistan that was part of the International Series of the 2000 ATP Tour. It was the fourth edition of the tournament and was held from 11 September until 17 September 2000. Second-seeded Marat Safin won the singles title.

Finals

Singles

 Marat Safin defeated  Davide Sanguinetti, 6–3, 6–4
 It was Safin's 5th singles title of the year and the 6th of his career.

Doubles

 Justin Gimelstob /  Scott Humphries defeated  Marius Barnard /  Robbie Koenig, 6–3, 6–2

See also
 2000 Tashkent Open

References

President's Cup
President's Cup
President's Cup
ATP Tashkent Open